UFC on Fox: Johnson vs. Reis (also known as UFC on Fox 24) was a mixed martial arts event produced by the Ultimate Fighting Championship held on April 15, 2017, at the Sprint Center in Kansas City, Missouri.

Background
The event was the first that the UFC has hosted in the state of Missouri and the Kansas City metropolitan area. 

A UFC Flyweight Championship match between current champion Demetrious Johnson and Wilson Reis headlined this event. The pairing was originally booked for UFC 201, but Johnson pulled out due to an undisclosed injury and the bout was scrapped.

UFC officials were initially targeting a featherweight bout between former UFC Bantamweight Champion Renan Barão and Choi Doo-ho to serve as the event headliner. However, as the announcement of the pairing began to circulate, Choi declined the bout, and as a result, Barao was rescheduled against a different opponent at another event.

Results

Bonus awards
The following fighters were awarded $50,000 bonuses:
Fight of the Night: Tim Elliott vs. Louis Smolka
Performance of the Night: Demetrious Johnson and Robert Whittaker

Records set
With his win, Johnson tied Anderson Silva's record for most consecutive title defenses (10).

See also
2017 in UFC
List of UFC events

References

Fox UFC
Mixed martial arts in Missouri
Sports in the Kansas City metropolitan area
2017 in mixed martial arts
April 2017 sports events in the United States
Events in Kansas City, Missouri